Neocollyris diardi is a species of ground beetle in the genus Neocollyris in the family Carabidae. It was described by Pierre André Latreille in 1822. This species is in terrestrial life zones that many researches have mistakenly overlooked.

References

Diardi, Neocollyris
Beetles described in 1822